Bing Bang Boom is the fourth studio album by American country music band Highway 101, released in 1991  It was the band's first release following the departure of original lead singer Paulette Carlson, with Nikki Nelson on lead vocals. The album's title track was its first single, reaching #14 on the Hot Country Singles & Tracks charts. After it came "The Blame" at #31, "Baby, I'm Missing You" at #22 and "Honky Tonk Baby" at #54.

Track listing

Personnel

Highway 101 
 Jack Daniels – electric guitar, background vocals
 Cactus Moser – drums, background vocals
 Nikki Nelson – rhythm guitar, lead vocals
 Curtis Stone – bass guitar, background vocals

Additional musicians 
 Buddy Emmons – pedal steel guitar
 Dave Flint – acoustic guitar
 John Hobbs – piano
 Bill Hullett – mandolin
 John "Skink" Noreen – pedal steel guitar, lap steel guitar
 Tommy Spurlock – electric Dobro, pedal steel guitar
 Harry Stinson – background vocals
 Dennis Wilson – background vocals
 Paul Worley – acoustic guitar

String section on "Till I Get It Right" by The A-Strings, conducted by Conni Ellisor, arranged by Bergen White.

Chart performance

Album

Singles

References 

Highway 101 albums
Albums produced by Paul Worley
Warner Records albums
1991 albums